Saudia Flight 162 was a scheduled flight from Dhahran International Airport, Saudi Arabia to Karachi International Airport, Pakistan that suffered a high-altitude uncontrolled decompression, above international waters off Qatar, killing 2 children who were among the 272 passengers.

Background
The accident aircraft was a Lockheed L-1011-200 TriStar, registration HZ-AHJ (c/n 1161).

Accident
After takeoff as the aircraft reached an altitude of 29,000 feet one of its main wheel tires failed, exploding and creating a hole in the fuselage and cabin floor. An emergency descent was initiated, followed by a successful landing at Qatar's Doha International Airport. Two young passengers were killed when they were ejected through the hole in the cabin floor.

Probable cause
The probable cause of the incident was determined to be a fatigue failure of a flange on the hub of one of the main landing gear wheels. This failure had resulted in one of the tires blowing out. The debris from this explosion had penetrated the cabin of the airplane, causing the explosive decompression. B.F. Goodrich Co. and Lockheed were found to share responsibility for their failure to assess safety hazards associated with this particular wheel design. In addition, the United States Federal Aviation Administration (FAA) was found to have had inadequate oversight of the manufacturers.

Aftermath 
The aircraft was repaired and returned to service with Saudia. It was retired in 1999 and later scrapped.

Notes

References

External links 

Aviation Safety Network accident synopsis

162
Aviation accidents and incidents in 1980
Accidents and incidents involving the Lockheed L-1011
Aviation accidents and incidents in Qatar
Airliner accidents and incidents involving in-flight depressurization
1980 in Qatar
1980 in Saudi Arabia
December 1980 events in Asia